Scott Bradley Wharton (born 3 October 1997) is an English professional footballer who plays as a defender for Blackburn Rovers.

Career
In October 2015, Wharton signed his first professional contract for two years and six months at Blackburn Rovers. In August 2016, he made his first team debut for Blackburn in the 2–2 draw against Burton Albion. He scored his first goal for Blackburn in a 4–3 EFL Cup win against Crewe Alexandra on 23 August 2016.

Wharton was on loan at Lincoln City through much of 2018. Wharton was cup-tied for Lincoln's win in the 2018 EFL Trophy Final. In January 2019, he joined Bury on loan until the end of the 2018–19 season. In July 2019 he joined Northampton Town on loan until the end of the season. Whilst on loan at Northampton Town, He was awarded the PFA Fans' League Two Player of the month award for November 2019.

Personal life
Scott's younger brother Adam Wharton is also a professional footballer.

Career statistics

Honours
Lincoln City
EFL League Two: 2018–19

Bury
EFL League Two runner-up: 2018–19

Northampton Town
EFL League Two play-offs: 2020

References

External links

1997 births
Living people
People from Blackburn
English footballers
Association football defenders
Blackburn Rovers F.C. players
Bury F.C. players
Cambridge United F.C. players
Lincoln City F.C. players
English Football League players